The A2 motorway, called the Miloš the Great Motorway is a motorway in Serbia under construction. It begins in Belgrade and runs southward to Čačak and Požega, then going further south towards Montenegro ending at the future Boljare border crossing, and west towards Bosnia and Herzegovina ending at the future Kotroman border crossing.

This motorway will provide a faster route to Montenegro by linking to the Bar-Boljare motorway, currently under construction.
It is frequently referred in Serbian media as part of proposed Corridor XI - an envisioned ferry/motorway corridor linking Bari (Italy), Bar (Montenegro), Belgrade (Serbia) and Bucharest (Romania).

Route

Section Belgrade—Požega
Subsection Surčin—Obrenovac
The northernmost subsection Surčin—Obrenovac starts on interchange “Surčin jug” with A1 motorway. It passes by Jakovo where will be main tool station, and it leaves Syrmia region by passing Sava and Kolubara rivers on 1766 meters-long bridge. The section ends close to the bridge on the “Obrenovac” interchange where next subsection, Obrenovac—Ub, starts. The construction of this 17.6 kilometer-long section started in 2017 and is completed by the end of 2019 with main contractor China Communications Construction Company (CCCC). 

Subsection Obrenovac—Ub
This 26.2 kilometers-long section was under construction from 2014 to 2019. The main contractor was Chinese company Shandong Hi-Speed Group. On this section there are 14 bridges, one rest area and exit 'Ub'. It goes through flat terrain in the Kolubara river valley.

Subsection Ub—Lajkovac
Section Ub—Lajkovac which is 12.5 kilometers-long is first completed section on A2 motorway. It was constructed from 2011 to 2014, and main contractors were Serbian companies 'Putevi Užice' and 'GP Planum'. Value of this section is 73 million euros and it was funded by the budget of the Government of Serbia. On this section there are 13 bridges, one rest area and exit „Lajkovac“. Even though it was completed in 2014, it could not be put into service while sections Obrenovac—Ub and Lajkovac—Ljig were under construction.

Subsection Lajkovac—Ljig
This 24 kilometers-long section was under construction from 2014 to 2019. Main contractor s Chinese company Shandong Hi-Speed Group. On this section there are 16 bridges, tunnel 'Brančići' (956m), one rest area and exit 'Ljig'. It goes through flat terrain in valley of Kolubara and Ljig rivers, and after Ljig it enters hilly terrain.

Subsection Ljig—Preljina
The 40.3 kilometers-long section Ljig—Preljina is first section of motorway A2 which was put into service. It was constructed from 2012 to 2016 by Azerbaijani company AzVirt. It starts near Dići which is few kilometers from Ljig, passes near Takovo where is exit 'Takovo' for Gornji Milanovac. This section ends on exit 'Preljina' near to Čačak, where will be interchange with future A5 motorway. On this section there are 66 bridges and 12 overpasses, 4 tunnels: 'Veliki Kik' (200m), 'Savinac' (270m/260m), 'Šarani' (937m/1040m) and 'Brđani' (456m/438m) and 3 rest areas.

Subsection Preljina—Požega
Subsection Preljina—Požega is currently under construction. It is 30.9 kilometers long and divided on 3 tranches: Preljina—Prijevor, Prijevor—Lučani and Lučani—Požega. Commercial contract with Chinese company China Communications Construction Company (CCCC) worth 450 million euros was signed in 2017. There will be 3 exits: 'Pakovraće' (near Čačak), 'Lučani' and 'Požega'. Also, one third of this subsection will be under bridges and 3 tunnels: 'Trbušani' (360m), 'Laz' (2562m) and 'Munjino Brdo' (2861m). The construction started in 2019 and it is expected to be completed by the end of 2021.

On interchange "Požega" near Prilipac motorway will be divided on two directions: to Boljare (border with Montenegro) and to Kotroman (border with Bosnia and Herzegovina). Motorway will pass through valleys of Čemernica and Zapadna Morava rivers, while from Prijevor it enters hilly terrain and bypasses Ovčar-Kablar Gorge.

Section Požega—Border with Montenegro
The last section of A2 motorway is a section going south from Požega to border with Montenegro near Boljare. This section will be more than 100 kilometers long, and the exact route is being chosen. Value of this section is estimated to be more than 1.5 billion euros. Motorway will go from Požega, pass next to Arilje and Ivanjica and reach Pešter plateau where it passes near Sjenica, and finishes on future border crossing Boljare with Montenegro. Section is very complicated to construct, there will be many bridges and tunnels, and it will be contracted after section Preljina—Požega is finished.

Section Požega—Kotroman with Bosnia and Herzegovina
The last section of A2 motorway is a section going west from Požega to border with Bosnia and Herzegovina.

List of exits

Exit list is shown just for sections between Belgrade and Požega, because the detailed route for section Požega—Boljare is currently unknown.

Image gallery

References

External links

 Regulation of State Roads
 Official site of PE Corridors of Serbia

Motorways in Serbia
Transport in Belgrade
Kolubara District
Moravica District
Zlatibor District